Air Minas Linhas Aéreas was an airline based in Belo Horizonte, Minas Gerais, Brazil. It operated passenger services from Belo Horizonte to destinations in the states of Minas Gerais and São Paulo. The airline was grounded on May 30, 2010 and lost its operational license on September 20, 2011.

History
The airline was established in 2002 by the businessman Clésio Andrade. In the end of 2005 it was bought by Urubatan Helu Teixeira for U$10 Million. The new owner has other transport interests including Brazil's largest courier company Braspress Transportes Urgentes.

Originally a general aviation company, Air Minas started its operations as a regular regional carrier on August 16, 2006. Its first service linked Belo Horizonte-Pampulha to Divinópolis, Varginha, and São Paulo-Guarulhos. In October of the same year, the services were extended to Bauru. In February 2007 Air Minas reached Araçatuba, Cuiabá and Rondonópolis and in May São José dos Campos, Campinas-Viracopos and Uberlândia.

The airline suspended all operations on May 30, 2010 for a major operational restructuring and on September 20, 2011 Air Minas lost its operational license. The fleet moving to CGR - Campo Grande Airport for stored, the former Skywest planes are sold to SETE (Brazil) and an African Operator. The former United Express plane sold to SETE, and 3 remanescent aircraft sold to Venezuela regional startup Albatros.

Destinations
In May 2010, before suspending its scheduled flights, Air Minas operated services to the following destinations:
Belo Horizonte – Pampulha/Carlos Drummond de Andrade Airport
Ipatinga – Usiminas Airport
Montes Claros – Mário Ribeiro Airport
São Paulo – Guarulhos/Gov. André Franco Montoro International Airport
Uberlândia – Ten. Cel. Av. César Bombonato Airport
Uberaba – Mário de Almeida Franco Airport

Destinations terminated before suspension of services

Araçatuba, Campinas-Viracopos, Cuiabá, Divinópolis, Rondonópolis, São José dos Campos, Varginha

Fleet
The fleet of Air Minas Linhas Aéreas included the following aircraft configured in all-economy class (as of June 2010):

See also
List of defunct airlines of Brazil

References

External links
Air Minas Linhas Aéreas
Air Minas Photo Archive at airliners.net
Braspress Transportes Urgentes

Defunct airlines of Brazil
Airlines established in 2002
Airlines disestablished in 2010
2002 establishments in Brazil